Edward Terry (3 February 1840 – 19 November 1907) was an Australian politician.

Born at Box Hill near Rouse Hill to landowner John Terry and Eleanor Rouse, he married Isabel Benson, with whom he had thirteen children. He owned the Eastwood Estate from around 1863 and built a racecourse at Eastwood. He was an alderman at Ryde from 1871 and served as mayor (1871–73, 1875–76, 1899). He was the member for Ryde in the New South Wales Legislative Assembly from 1898 to 1901 and again from January to July 1904, both times as an Independent Protectionist. Terry died at Eastwood in 1907.

References

 

1840 births
1907 deaths
Independent members of the Parliament of New South Wales
Members of the New South Wales Legislative Assembly
Mayors of Ryde
19th-century Australian politicians